Phillip James Butterfield Jr. (November 30, 1927 – November 26, 2002) was an American football player and coach.  He served as the head football coach at Ithaca College from 1967 to 1994.  During his 28 seasons at Ithaca, Butterfield was one of the most successful coaches in the country winning 206 games and three NCAA Division III Football Championships (known as the Stagg Bowl). His teams finished as the runner-up in the Stagg Bowl four times.  His total playoff record was 21–8.

After his retirement, Ithaca renamed their football stadium in his honor.  Butterfield was inducted into the College Football Hall of Fame as a coach in 1997.  He died of complications from Alzheimer's disease in 2002 in Ithaca, New York.

Personal
Butterfield grew up in Westborough, Massachusetts. He graduated from Westborough High School in 1945 and in 1995 was inducted into the school's hall of fame.

Butterfield's brother, Jack, was a college baseball coach and executive in the New York Yankees organization. His nephew, Brian, is a Major League Baseball coach, who last coached with the Los Angeles Angels.

Head coaching record

College

See also
 List of college football coaches with 200 wins

References

External links
 

1927 births
2002 deaths
American football guards
Colgate Raiders football coaches
Ithaca Bombers football coaches
Maine Black Bears football coaches
Maine Black Bears football players
High school football coaches in Massachusetts
College Football Hall of Fame inductees
United States Navy personnel of World War II
United States Navy sailors
Sportspeople from Ithaca, New York
People from Westborough, Massachusetts
Sportspeople from Worcester County, Massachusetts
Coaches of American football from Florida
Coaches of American football from Massachusetts
Players of American football from Tampa, Florida
Players of American football from Massachusetts